USS LST-1038 was a  built for the United States Navy during World War II. She was later named Monroe County (LST-1038)  after counties in seventeen U.S. States – the only U.S. Naval vessel to bear the name – but never saw active service under the latter name.

Originally laid down as USS LST-1038 on 29 October 1944 by the Dravo Corporation of Pittsburgh, Pennsylvania; launched on 6 January 1945, sponsored by Mrs. Elwood Printz; and commissioned at New Orleans on 5 February 1945.

Service history

World War II, 1945
Following shakedown exercises along the Florida gulf coast, LST-1038 returned to New Orleans for availability then steamed to Gulfport, Mississippi and Mobile, Alabama, taking on side-carry pontoons at the former and cargo ammunition at the latter. Loaded by 15 March, she departed for the Panama Canal en route to the western Pacific. Steaming independently, she arrived at Ulithi on 4 May, departing again on the 8th with convoy UOL 11, then headed west to the embattled Ryukyus. On 16 May she sighted Kerama Retto and, after reporting to CTG 31.15, commenced supplying ammunition to fleet units as necessary, primarily DDs and DMSs. The constant threat of Japanese air attack kept the crew alert at all times, bringing them to general quarters at least once every day for the next month. On 10 June she shifted her operating area to Nakagusuku Wan, Okinawa where she carried out similar ammunition supply ship missions for CTG 31.19 until the end of the month. She then got underway for Leyte, arriving on 6 July to begin availability.

Post-war activities, 1945–1949
Two days after the formal Japanese surrender in Tokyo Bay, on 2 September, LST-1038 cleared Subic Bay en route to Luzon where she took on personnel attached to headquarters, XI Army, for transportation to Wakayama, Honshū for occupation duty. Disembarking her passengers on the 25th, she returned to the Philippines to take on further occupation troops. During the next two months she completed two more troop lifts, one from the Philippines, the other from Okinawa. On 27 December she sailed for Saipan, thence steamed to Tinian where she took on cargo for Guam. Arriving there on 10 January 1946, she sailed again on 2 February heading for the Russells for temporary duty under ComMarianas in connection with rollup of ocean bases in that area.

Detached from the Pacific Fleet in the spring, LST-1088 headed back toward the Panama Canal and duty on the Atlantic coast. In May she reported to the 3rd Naval District and for the next three years served as a training vessel for naval reservists in the New York area.

Decommissioning
In 1949 she was ordered south for inactivation. Decommissioning in June, she entered the Atlantic Reserve Fleet, berthing at Green Cove Springs, Florida. Renamed USS Monroe County (LST-1038) on 1 July 1955, she remained in Florida until 1958, when she was struck from the Naval Vessel Register on 1 November 1958. Her final fate is unknown.

Awards
LST-1038 received one battle star for her World War II service.

References

 
 

LST-542-class tank landing ships
World War II amphibious warfare vessels of the United States
Cold War amphibious warfare vessels of the United States
Ships built in Pittsburgh
1945 ships
Monroe County, Alabama
Monroe County, Arkansas
Monroe County, Florida
Monroe County, Georgia
Monroe County, Illinois
Monroe County, Indiana
Monroe County, Iowa
Monroe County, Kentucky
Monroe County, Michigan
Monroe County, Mississippi
Monroe County, Missouri
Monroe County, New York
Monroe County, Ohio
Monroe County, Pennsylvania
Monroe County, Tennessee
Monroe County, West Virginia
Monroe County, Wisconsin
Ships built by Dravo Corporation